Prenoxdiazine (marketed as Libexin) is a cough suppressant. It acts peripherally by desensitizing the pulmonary stretch receptors. Therefore, there's a reduction of cough impulses originating in the lungs. Prenoxdiazine is indicated in cough of bronchial origin.

References 

Antitussives
1-Piperidinyl compounds
Oxadiazoles